NGC 7742 also known as Fried Egg Galaxy is a face-on unbarred spiral galaxy  in the constellation Pegasus. It is also classified as a Type II Seyfert Galaxy.

The galaxy is unusual in that it contains a ring but no bar.  Typically, bars are needed to produce a ring structure.  The bars' gravitational forces move gas to the ends of the bars, where it forms into the rings seen in many barred spiral galaxies.  In this galaxy, however, no bar is present, so this mechanism cannot be used to explain the formation of the ring.  O. K. Sil'chenko and A. V. Moiseev proposed that the ring was formed partly as the result of a merger event in which a smaller gas-rich dwarf galaxy collided with NGC 7742.  As evidence for this, they point to the unusually bright central region, the presence of highly inclined central gas disk, and the presence of gas that is counterrotating (or rotating in the opposite direction) with respect to the stars.

Two Type II supernovae, SN 1993R and SN 2014cy, have been detected in NGC 7742.

See also
 NGC 7217 - a face-on spiral galaxy with identical characteristics
 Sombrero Galaxy - a similar galaxy with a dust ring

Gallery

References

External links

NGC 7742 at ESA/Hubble

Ring galaxies
Unbarred spiral galaxies
Pegasus (constellation)
7742
12760
72260